"Don't Laugh at Me" is a song written by Allen Shamblin and Steve Seskin, and recorded by American country music artist Mark Wills.  It was released in July 1998 as the second single from album Wish You Were Here. Like "I Do (Cherish You)" before it, "Don't Laugh at Me" was a number 2 hit on the Billboard country charts. The song received Country Music Association nominations for Country Music Association's Single, Song and Video of the Year in 1998.

Background
Allen Shamblin was inspired to write the song after his school-aged daughter came home and confided that she was being teased by her peers because of her freckles.

Content
The song is a ballad in which various characters, such as children who have been teased or a homeless man begging on a street corner, ask for acceptance from others.

Wills has received letters from teachers and students who have said that they can identify with the song's story. According to him, "everyone can relate to [the song]…Everyone at some point in their life has been picked on, made fun of or put down." He told Billboard magazine that the song is "one of the strongest songs I've ever recorded in terms of dealing with life in general."

Music video
The music video was directed by Jim Hershleder and premiered in mid-1998. It features Wills performing the song at a school playground at night, witnessing scenes of bullying as depicted in the song.

Chart performance
"Don't Laugh at Me" debuted at number 69 on the U.S. Billboard Hot Country Singles & Tracks for the week of July 18, 1998. The song peaked at number 2 on the Hot Country Songs chart on October 10, 1998 for two weeks and was kept out of the top spot by "Where the Green Grass Grows" by Tim McGraw.

Year-end charts

Peter, Paul and Mary version

Peter Yarrow attended a performance by co-writer Seskin at the Kerrville Folk Festival, which led to his recording the song with Peter, Paul and Mary. Their version appeared as the sole new recording on their compilation album Songs of Conscience and Concern. The song helped inspire Yarrow to found the non-profit organization Operation Respect, promoting tolerance and civility programs in education. The organization distributes curriculum programs under the "Don't Laugh At Me" name. In conjunction with this program, the song has been made into a children's book including an afterword by Yarrow. Part of the proceeds from the book go to Operation Respect.

Lagwagon version
In 2014 Lagwagon recorded a punk rock version of this song which was published as "bonus track" from their record Hang.

References

Songs about bullying
1998 singles
1998 songs
Mark Wills songs
Songs written by Steve Seskin
Songs written by Allen Shamblin
Song recordings produced by Carson Chamberlain
Mercury Records singles
1990s ballads
Country ballads